Cleveland  is a land of hills and dales from the River Tees to Vale of Pickering, England. The name means “cliff-land”.

The area corresponds to the former Langbaurgh Wapentake. The North York Moors national park, established in 1952, covers part of it. A non-metropolitan county under the same name existed from 1974 to 1996 and there is ambiguity today between that county and the historic extent of the name.

Heritage
Cleveland has a centuries-long association with the area from Middlesbrough to Pickering and Thirsk to Whitby, effectively the eastern half of Yorkshire's North Riding. Ralph, Archdeacon of Cleveland, was the area's first archdeacon recorded, before 1174. A Dukedom of Cleveland was first created in the 17th century.

Metal

The Cleveland Hills were key suppliers of the ironstone which was essential to running blast furnaces alongside the River Tees. Cleveland’s rich ore has created a significant industrial heritage arising from its central role in the 19th century iron boom that led to Middlesbrough growing from a hamlet into a major industrial town in only a matter of decades. Teesport is one of the United Kingdom's main ports, initially due to the iron boom, with other heavy industrial plants between Middlesbrough and Redcar.

Name's usage
Legislation creating the Cleveland Parliamentary constituency (1885–1974) was the first use of Cleveland referring narrowly to land around the River Tees. The constituency was created by the division of the North Riding constituency, and was succeeded in name by the Cleveland and Whitby for the February 1974 general election. The county of Cleveland followed on similar boundaries, also including areas north of the River Tees.

The official name, from 1974, of the ”CLEVELAND” (TS postcode was formed from “TeeS“ or “Tees-Side”) postal county refers to a larger area including the non-metropolitan county and to the moors.

Cleveland is a common place name in the USA and Canada, but relatively few of these places are named directly after this region in England.  Many of the towns, as well as two counties and a national forest, are named after US President Grover Cleveland.  Other towns are named after the City of Cleveland, Ohio, which in turn was named in honor of Moses Cleaveland, a founder of the city.

Geographical features

The area is geographically varied:
North York Moors
Howardian Hills
Roseberry Topping: a distinctive hill. Its original roughly conical form was undercut by extensive mining, giving it a jagged appearance that many have thought reminiscent of the Matterhorn mountain.
 River Tees
 River Leven
 Eston Nab

Districts

Hambleton (part)
Middlesbrough
Redcar and Cleveland
Stockton-on-Tees (south Tees)
Scarborough

Titles
 Lord Lieutenant of Cleveland
 High Sheriff of Cleveland
 Duke of Cleveland
 Earl of Cleveland

See also
 Cleveland Bay
 Cleveland Way
 Cleveland Mountain Rescue Team
 Cleveland Bridge & Engineering Company, major structural engineering company
Cleveland Shopping Centre
 Ironstone mining in Cleveland and North Yorkshire

References

External links
 Images of Cleveland at the English Heritage Archive

 
Ancient subdivisions of Yorkshire